The Science of Life is a book written by H. G. Wells, Julian Huxley and G. P. Wells, published in three volumes by The Waverley Publishing Company Ltd in 1929–30, giving a popular account of all major aspects of biology as known in the 1920s. It has been called "the first modern textbook of biology" and "the best popular introduction to the biological sciences". Wells's most recent biographer notes that The Science of Life "is not quite as dated as one might suppose".

In undertaking The Science of Life, H. G. Wells, who had published The Outline of History a decade earlier, selling over two million copies, desired the same sort of treatment for biology. He thought of his readership as "the intelligent lower middle classes ... [not] idiots, half-wits ... greenhorns, religious fanatics ... smart women or men who know all that there is to be known".

Julian Huxley, the grandson of T. H. Huxley under whom Wells had studied biology, and Wells' son "Gip", a zoologist, divided the initial writing between them; H. G. Wells revised, dealt (with the help of his literary agent, A. P. Watt) with publishers, and acted as a strict taskmaster, often obliging his collaborators to sit down and work together and keeping them on a tight schedule. (H. G. Wells had begun the book during his wife's final illness and is said to have used work on the book as a way to keep his mind off his loss.)

The text as published is presented as the common work of a "triplex author". H. G. Wells took 40% of the royalties; the remainder was split between Huxley and Wells's son. In his will, H. G. Wells left his rights in the book to G. P. Wells.

In 1927, Huxley gave up his chair of Zoology at King's College, London to concentrate on the work. Thanks to the success of the book, Huxley was able to give up teaching and devote himself to administration and experimental science.

The book was originally serialised in 31 fortnightly parts, published in 3 volumes in 1929–30 and in a single volume in 1931. The volume includes more than 300 illustrations. It was a great success, though the stock market crash and subsequent depression held back sales, in part because of declining memberships in book clubs.

It has been said of Book Four (The How and Why of Development and Evolution) that it "offers perhaps the clearest, most readable, succinct and informative popular account of the subject ever penned. It was here that [Huxley] first expounded his own version of what later developed into the evolutionary synthesis".

The Science of Life is also notable for its introduction of modern ecological concepts. It is also notable for its emphasis on the importance of behaviorism and Jung's psychology.  Toward the end The Science of Life strays from the scientific to the moral realm and devotes a chapter (Book Eight, Ch. VIII: "Modern Ideas of Conduct") to practical moral advice to the reader, advising him (the masculine pronoun is used throughout, a universal practice circa 1930): "After his primary duties to himself, the first duty of Mr. Everyman to others is to learn about himself, to acquire poise and make his persona as much of a cultivated gentleman as he can. He has to be considerate. He has to be trustworthy."  In its last pages, Wells emphasises the lack of "credibility" of personal immortality, and advocates "realization of [one's] participation in a greater being with which he identifies himself", whether this be "the Deity" or "Man".

Publication record
The Science of Life: a summary of contemporary knowledge about life and its possibilities was first issued in 31 fortnightly parts published by Amalgamated Press in 1929–30, bound up in three volumes as publication proceeded. A mail-order version of the book was also published, though this was dropped after the stock market crash. It was first issued in one volume by Cassell in 1931, and reprinted in 1934 and 1937; a popular edition, fully revised, with a new preface by H. G. Wells, appeared in 1938. It was again published as separate volumes by Cassell in 1934–1937: I The living body. II Patterns of life (1934). III Evolution—fact and theory. IV Reproduction, heredity and the development of sex. V The history and adventure of life. VI The drama of life. VII How animals behave (1937). VIII Man's mind and behaviour. IX Biology and the human race. In New York, it was published by Doubleday, Doran & Co. in 1931, 1934 and 1939; and by The Literary Guild in 1934. Doubleday also issued a four-volume limited edition of the work in 1931, limited to 750 sets, with the first volume autographed on the limitation page by the three authors. Three of the Cassell spin-off books were also published by Doubleday in 1932: Evolution, fact and theory; The human mind and the behaviour of Man; Reproduction, genetics and the development of sex. The Science of Life was translated into French. During World War II a one-volume edition designed for use in military classes was issued. As late as 1960 the work was still being used in college classes in the US

Of historic interest is Book Three – The Incontrovertible Fact of Evolution, comprising five chapters; I. The fact to be proved, II. The evidence in the rocks, III. The evidence from plant and animal structure, IV. The evidence from the variation and distribution of living things, V. The evolution of Man. Considering that this was written less than five years from the Scopes Trial, it is a bold, comprehensive account of the scientific knowledge of evolution at the time. Book Four concentrates on the controversies about evolution concluding that "the broad positions of Darwinism emerge from a scrutiny of the most exacting sort, essentially unchanged".

The section entitled "The Ecological Outlook" anticipates many of the themes of the later green movement, including stressing the importance of reducing pollution and protecting endangered species from extinction, as well as the importance of alternative power sources.

The reference given is the most complete available, but there may have been other publishers and dates, and some books may have been given alternative titles. There are editions in some other languages.

Outline
Introduction
The Range, Nature, and Study of Living Things 1
Book One—The Living Body
The Body is a Machine 24
The Complex Body-Machine and How It Works 32
The Harmony and Direction of the Body-Machine 97
 The Wearing Out of the Machine and Its Reproduction 140
Book Two—The Chief Patterns of Life
The First Great Phylum: Vertebrates 168
The Second Great Phylum: The Arthropods 194
Further Patterns of Individualized Animal Life 210
Less Individualized Animals 235
Vegetable Life 253
The Lowly and Minute 268
Is our Knowledge of the forms of life complete? 311
Book Three—The Incontrovertible Fact of Evolution
The Fact to be Proved 314
The Evidence of the Rocks 318
The Evidence from Plant and Animal Structure 356
The Evidence from the Variation and Distribution of Living Things 374
The Evolution of Man 402
Book Four—The Hows and the Why of Development and Evolution
The Essence of the Controversies about Evolution 425
How Individuals Originate 433
The Mechanism of Inheritance 459
The A B C of Genetics 468
The Growth of the Individual 508
What Determines Sex 552
Variation of Species 576
Selection in Evolution 600
Is there a mystical Evolutionary Urge? 629
Book Five—The History and Adventures of Life
The Prologue 644
Life Before Fossils 660
The Era of Crawling and Swimming 675
Life Conquers the Dry Land 701
The Full Conquest of the Land 738
The Modern Era 774
Man Dawns Upon the World 796
Book Six—The Spectacle of Life
Habitats 823
Life in the Sea 839
Life in Fresh Water and on Land 878
Some Special Aspects of Life 922
The Science of Ecology 961
Life Under Control 1012
Book Seven—Health and Disease
Infectious and Contagious Disease 1033
The Nourishment of the Body 1054
Fresh Air and Sunlight 1076
The Present Health of Homo Sapiens 1089
Book Eight—Behavior, Feeling, and Thought
Rudiments of Behaviour 1102
How Insects and Other Invertebrates Behave 1147
The Evolution of Behaviour in Vertebrates 1200
Consciousness 1270
The Culminating Brain 1278
The Cortex at Work 1288
Human Behaviour and the Human Mind 1318
Modern Ideas of Conduct 1390
Borderland Science and the Question of Personal Survival 1411
Book Nine—Biology of the Human Race
Peculiarities of the Species Homo Sapiens 1436
The Present Phase of Human Association 1454
Index 1481–1515
The pagination is that of the 1934 Literary Guild edition.

References

External links
Online edition 1931 facsimile edition in Internet Archive

1930 non-fiction books
Biology books
Books by H. G. Wells
Evolutionary biology literature
Cassell (publisher) books
1930 in biology